Daniel Joseph Serafini (born January 25, 1974) is an American former left-handed baseball relief pitcher. He was taken in the first round (26th overall) by the Minnesota Twins in the 1992 MLB draft.

Early life
Serafini attended Junípero Serra High School. In 1991, in a 7–0 win over Salinas High School, Serafini pitched a CIF Central Coast Section playoff no-hitter. It remains the only playoff no-hitter in school history.

Professional career

Draft and minor leagues
Serafini was a first round draft pick in the 1992 Major League Baseball draft when the Minnesota Twins selected him as the 26th overall pick. He was drafted out of Junípero Serra High School.

He began his professional career after signing with the Twins when he played for the rookie league team, the GCL Twins. He played in 8 games in 1992 and posted a 1–0 record with a 3.64 ERA. In 1993, he played for the Fort Wayne Wizards, the Twins Single-A team. He made 27 starts and posted a 10–8 record with a 3.65 ERA. He played for the Fort Myers Miracle, the Twins High-A team, in 1994. He made 23 starts and had a 9–9 record with a 4.61 ERA. While with the Double-A New Britain Rock Cats in 1995, he was an All-Star in the Eastern League. Overall while with the Rock Cats, he went 12–9 with a 3.37 ERA. He also made one relief appearance for the Salt Lake Buzz, the Twins Triple-A affiliate, in 1995.

In 1996, he was rated by Baseball America as the 76th-ranked prospect in the minor leagues.

Minnesota Twins (1996–1998)
He made his major league debut on June 25 against the New York Yankees. He started the game and pitched 4.1 innings, gave up 5 runs, and got the loss. It was his only major league game of the year and pitched for the Salt Lake Buzz in the remainder of the 1996 season.

He pitched in the major leagues for the Twins in parts of the 1997 and 1998 seasons.

Chicago Cubs (1999)
His contract was purchased by the Chicago Cubs from the Twins on March 31, 1999. He played for the Cubs for the majority of the season, going 3–2 with a 6.93 ERA in 42 games (4 starts). That year, he also made two starts for the Iowa Cubs, the Cubs' Triple-A team.

San Diego Padres (2000)
In the 1999 offseason, on December 22, he was traded to the San Diego Padres for minor league outfielder Brandon Pernell. He pitched in 3 games for the Padres and recorded an 18.00 ERA. He also played for the Triple-A Las Vegas 51s in which he had a 6.88 ERA in 26 games (4 starts).

Pittsburgh Pirates (2000)
He was then traded to the Pittsburgh Pirates for minor league pitcher Andy Bausher on June 28, 2000, and was assigned to Triple-A Nashville. He made 7 starts for the Nashville Sounds, in which he went 4–3 with a 2.68 ERA. His performance earned him a callup to the Pirates major league club and he pitched in the rotation from August 5 until the end of the season, making 11 starts in which he went 2–5 with a 4.91 ERA.

He was released by the Pirates on March 20, 2001.

San Francisco Giants
He was signed to a minor league contract by the San Francisco Giants on March 27. He began the year with the Triple-A Fresno Grizzlies, but was released on April 24.

New York Mets
He was then signed to a minor league contract on May 8 by the New York Mets. He played for the Triple-A Norfolk Tides before being released on August 5.

Milwaukee Brewers
He signed another minor league contract two days later, this time with the Milwaukee Brewers. He played for the Triple-A Indianapolis Indians for the rest of the 2001 season and was granted free agency on October 15.

Anaheim Angels
Serafini signed with the Anaheim Angels on November 3, 2001, but was released on March 28, 2002 before the season began.

St. Louis Cardinals
He did not play in 2002 and signed with the St. Louis Cardinals on November 14, 2002. He began the 2003 season for the Triple-A Memphis Redbirds but was released on April 21, 2003, after going 0–1 with a 9.00 ERA in 3 games (2 starts). He then went to play in the Mexican League.

Cincinnati Reds (2003)
His contract was purchased by the Cincinnati Reds on August 25, 2003 from the Mexican League. He played in his first major game since 2000 when he started a game for the Reds on August 26 against the Milwaukee Brewers. After 4 starts in which he went 0–3 with a 6.27 ERA, he was put into the bullpen for the remainder of the 2003 season. He went 1–3 with a 5.40 ERA in 10 games for the Reds in 2003. Following the season, he was granted free agency on October 4.

Chiba Lotte Marines (2004–2005) and Orix Buffaloes (2006–2007)
From 2004 to 2007, Serafini pitched in Japan. He played for the Chiba Lotte Marines in 2004 and 2005, and the Orix Buffaloes in 2006 and 2007.

Colorado Rockies (2007)
Serafini returned to major league baseball in the United States on July 31, 2007, when he signed a minor league contract with the Colorado Rockies. He was assigned to the Triple-A Colorado Springs Sky Sox. He played in 11 games (3 starts) for the Sky Sox. He went 0–1 with a 3.48 ERA. On September 4, 2007, when rosters expanded, his contract was purchased by the major league club. The next day, he played in his first major league game since 2003, when he came in to pitch against the San Francisco Giants. He was used as a left-handed specialist for the Rockies. He pitched in just 3 games in his callup and had a 54.00 ERA in 1/3 innings. He became a free agent after the 2007 season.

On November 27, 2007, Major League Baseball suspended Serafini 50 games for testing positive for a performance-enhancing substance in violation of the league's joint drug prevention and treatment program. Serafini blamed the suspension on taking the substances in Japan for medical reasons as prescribed by Japanese doctors, and states he stopped taking them when he entered the US.

Later career
Serafini spent the 2008 and 2009 seasons with the Sultanes de Monterrey in the Mexican League.

In 2010, Serafini played for the Cañeros de Los Mochis in the Mexican Pacific League, the Bridgeport Bluefish of the Atlantic League, and then appeared for Mexico in the February 2011 Caribbean Series.

In 2012, Serafini began the season with the Mexican League, then ended up with the Bridgeport Bluefish of the Atlantic League. With the Bluefish he started 13 games and compiled a 4.02 ERA and 5–3 record. His last game was on August 26, 2012, vs the Sugar Land Skeeters—the day after Roger Clemens' notorious start with the same team. Although still on the Bluefish roster, Perry Miles, the voice of the Bluefish, suggested that was Serafini's last appearance of the season.

He then went back to the Mexican League, signing with the Naranjeros de Hermosillo on November 23, 2012.

Post-playing career
Serafini currently owns the 'Throw Like a Pro Baseball Academy' in the Sparks, Nevada area. He offers baseball players customized personal training, focused on preventing injury and the areas of mechanics, pitching, fielding, and batting.

Serafini and his wife also owned a bar in Sparks called 'The Oak Tavern' (formerly named ‘The Bullpen Bar’), a bar which was featured on an episode of Bar Rescue that aired on June 28, 2015.

References

External links

Throw Like a Pro Baseball Academy
The blogger at Serafini Says recounts the story of his radio interview
Coverage of the Serafini impersonation incident from www.deadspin.com

1974 births
Living people
American people of Italian descent
American expatriate baseball players in Japan
American expatriate baseball players in Mexico
American expatriate baseball players in Taiwan
American sportspeople in doping cases
Baseball players from San Francisco
Bridgeport Bluefish players
Cañeros de Los Mochis players
Chiba Lotte Marines players
Chinatrust Whales players
Chicago Cubs players
Cincinnati Reds players
Colorado Rockies players
Colorado Springs Sky Sox players
Fort Myers Miracle players
Fort Wayne Wizards players
Fresno Grizzlies players
Gulf Coast Twins players
Hardware City Rock Cats players
Indianapolis Indians players
Iowa Cubs players
Las Vegas Stars (baseball) players
Major League Baseball pitchers
Major League Baseball players suspended for drug offenses
Memphis Redbirds players
Mexican League baseball pitchers
Minnesota Twins players
Naranjeros de Hermosillo players
Nashville Sounds players
Navegantes del Magallanes players
American expatriate baseball players in Venezuela
Nippon Professional Baseball pitchers
Norfolk Tides players
Orix Buffaloes players
Pittsburgh Pirates players
Rieleros de Aguascalientes players
Salt Lake Buzz players
San Diego Padres players
Sultanes de Monterrey players
Tiburones de La Guaira players
Tigres de Quintana Roo players
Yaquis de Obregón players
2009 World Baseball Classic players
2013 World Baseball Classic players
Junípero Serra High School (San Mateo, California) alumni